Andrea Vavassori and David Vega Hernández were the defending champions but only Vega Hernández chose to defend his title, partnering Fernando Romboli. Vega Hernández lost in the semifinals to Zdeněk Kolář and Jiří Lehečka.

Kolář and Lehečka won the title after defeating Karol Drzewiecki and Aleksandar Vukic 6–4, 3–6, [10–5] in the final.

Seeds

Draw

References

External links
 Main draw

Poznań Open - Doubles
2021 Doubles